Steam Incorporated, often abbreviated to Steam Inc., is a railway heritage and preservation society based at the Paekākāriki railway station, Paekākāriki at the southern end of the Kapiti Coast, approximately 50 minutes north of Wellington on the west coast of New Zealand's North Island. Unlike some societies who operate on preserved sections of closed branch lines, Steam Incorporated own a depot ("The Engine Shed") beside one of the country's most important railway lines, the North Island Main Trunk railway, and restores heritage locomotives and rolling stock for use on excursions on the regular national rail network.

History 
Paekākāriki's close association with the railway began in 1886 when the Wellington and Manawatu Railway Company's line from Wellington to Longburn opened. Paekākāriki Railway Station was a large station despite the settlement's small size, as it was ideally located as a locomotive changeover point - powerful engines were required to tackle the difficult grades between Wellington and Paekākāriki, while lighter and more nimble ones were better suited to the gentle grades and straight track through the Kāpiti Coast and Horowhenua to Manawatū.

The New Zealand Railways Department (NZR) took over the Wellington and Manawatu Railway in December 1908, but Paekākāriki's status as an important depot remained unchanged.  In 1940, the line from Wellington to Paekākāriki was electrified and Paekākāriki's depot was altered: it became the changeover point from electric to steam motive power, or electric to diesel from the 1950s onwards. Paekākāriki also was an important goods transfer point between NZR and its "Rail Air" service that operated out of Paraparaumu across Cook Strait, before the inter-island rail ferries were introduced. A large shed was constructed at Paekākāriki by the US Marines stationed in the area for use with the Rail Air service during World War II.

In the late 1960s with steam power coming to an end, the locomotive depot in Paekākāriki was closed and the diesel locomotives that replaced steam were based out of Wellington instead. The main engine shed was demolished along with a number of other buildings, but the Rail Air Shed, two signal boxes, amenities building and a turntable remained when Steam Incorporated acquired the site. New sheds were constructed to replace those demolished, and the Rail Air Shed and amenities buildings were acquired when it became available. While initially leasing a portion of the site, Steam Incorporated now owns the whole former depot site including the 70 ft turntable, to which the railways retain a right of access.

Steam Incorporated
As steam started to disappear from the NZR network, a group of enthusiasts united to preserve steam locomotives with the express intention of running them on the mainline network. At the time, all locomotives that had been preserved were solely for use on heritage railways or for static display, and as the NZR sold locomotives on the proviso that they would never again run on the NZR network, it was a radical concept.

Steam Incorporated was formed in 1972, and locomotives were purchased by the society or for the society by members. Until 1985, NZR had decreed that no steam locomotives were to run on mainlines. NZR then allowed one mainline excursion a year. In 1988, following the success of the Ferrymead 125 celebrations, NZR agreed to lift the ban and charged enthusiasts to use the network. As a result, Steam Incorporated were able to run excursions on the network from their Paekākāriki base. In 1988, Steam Incorporated also acquired two DA class locomotives recently withdrawn by NZR.

List of Locomotives

|}

In Addition:

 J 1211 and KA 942, now of Mainline Steam were originally stored at Paekakariki  before restoration in the Auckland area.
 WMR #9/N 453 owned by the Wellington and Manawatu Railway Trust is currently based at Steam Incorporated, with some work having been carried out towards its restoration.
 NRZ 15A class Garratt 398, owned by the Flying Fifteen Locomotive Society arrived at Steam Incorporated in May 2011. The locomotive is being prepared for long-term storage, however, the group have eventual plans to run it on the mainline.
 1909-built 0-4-0T Barclay #1181, acquired from Len Southward in the 1970s was owned by the group until it was sold in 2012 to a private owner for restoration, based at the Silver Stream Railway.
 A&G Price rail tractor NO 152 was bought by Steam Incorporated in 1978. It was rendered surplus to the group's requirements in 1994 and is now with the Ormondville Rail Preservation Group.
 DSA 305 was purchased by Steam Incorporated in 1986 from the NZR. It was used until 1994 when it was sold to the Bay of Islands Vintage Railway, and has since been on-sold to a private owner at Cable Bay.
 The remains of WB 292 and WB 299, owned by Hugh McCracken, were stored at Paekakariki from 1989 until 2013 when they were moved to the Rimutaka Incline Railway Heritage Trust depot at Maymorn for restoration.

Rolling stock 

Steam Incorporated owns one of New Zealand's largest fleets of heritage passenger carriages certified for mainline operation on the regular national network.  Originally painted in a unique chocolate brown livery with yellow lining to differentiate them from carriages in service on regular trains, the paint was found to fade and look shabby, and when Tranz Rail, NZR's successor repainted their carriages in a blue livery in the early 1990s, Steam Incorporated reverted to the "Midland Red" paint scheme that had been used for most passenger carriages in New Zealand since the 1920s. 
Steam Incorporated own a variety of carriage types, such as five wide-bodied AA class 50 ft wooden passenger carriages with balcony ends. In 2008, these carriages were painted in "Pullman Green" for use in the North Island Main Trunk Railway centenary celebrations. In addition, Steam Inc. have a number of 50-foot and 56-foot steel-clad passenger carriages, one of which has been converted for use as a buffet/souvenir car. The active fleet stands at twelve fully restored and mainline certified carriages, with one currently under restoration, one awaiting mainline certification and nine stored (4).

Along with carriages, the society owns a number of guards vans and former goods wagons, some of which are certified for mainline operation as locomotive service wagons.

Carriages

Guards vans

Wagons

Excursions 
Steam Incorporated has operated or participated in excursions to almost all parts of the national railway network that has been open since the late 1970s.  As one of the first organisations to operate a private carriage fleet, excursions have been run since 1978. During the early years of the society's existence, NZR would not permit heritage operators to use their own locomotives on the national network, thus limiting the society's locomotive activities to the area of The Engine Shed. Since 1985 however, this policy has been abandoned and Steam Incorporated have run the majority of their excursions using society owned Steam and Diesel locomotives.  Popular excursions have been through the central North Island, annual "Art Deco" expresses to Napier, to the centennial celebrations at Dunedin Railway Station in 2006, and to the centennial celebrations at Feilding in 2008. Some excursions are operated solely by Steam Incorporated crews with the society's own equipment (with the locomotive driver and fireman supplied by Kiwirail), while others have been in conjunction with other New Zealand preservation societies and their locomotives, such as the "double drivers" excursions featuring two KA class locomotives.

Some of the more notable involvements Steam Incorporated have had were in 1993 when KA 945 and Steam Inc carriages toured for 3 weeks around New Zealand on the "Crunchie Train", and in 2008 when Steam Incorporated operated the Parliamentary Special NIMT Centennial train on behalf of ONTRACK, using primarily Steam Incorporated carriages and a mix of Steam Inc. and other mainline certified locomotives.

References

Citations

Bibliography

External links
 Official website of Steam Incorporated

Rail transport preservation in New Zealand
Rail transport in Wellington
Kapiti Coast District
Tourist attractions in the Wellington Region